Jonathan "Jono" van Hazel (born 19 September 1978) is an Australian former swimmer who specialized in freestyle events. He is a member of City of Perth Comets Swim Club and is coached and trained by Bernie Mulroy.

Van Hazel qualified for the men's 4 × 100 m freestyle relay, as a member of the Australian team at the 2004 Summer Olympics in Athens, by finishing fifth from the Olympic trials in Sydney in 50.17. In the final, the Australian team finished sixth in 3:15.77. Teaming with Ashley Callus, Eamon Sullivan, and Todd Pearson in the heats, van Hazel swam the third leg, and recorded a split of 49.65 to qualify further for the final in a time of 3:17.64.

References

External links
Profile – Australian Olympic Team

1978 births
Living people
Australian people of Dutch descent
Australian male freestyle swimmers
Olympic swimmers of Australia
Swimmers at the 2004 Summer Olympics
Sportsmen from Western Australia
Swimmers from Perth, Western Australia